Patrik Lomski (born 3 February 1989) is a retired Finnish football player who played mainly as a winger for  TPS. Lomski has represented Finland at many different youth levels. He is a versatile player who can play anywhere on the forward line.

Career

Lomski scored for Arka Gdynia in his Polish I liga debut against GKS Tychy 8 March 2015.

On 23 August 2016, he rejoined his youth club TPS on a contract until the season after playing 1.5 years for Arka Gdynia.

References

External links
 
 Patrik Lomski at Footballdatabase

1989 births
Living people
Finnish footballers
Footballers from Turku
Turun Palloseura footballers
Vaasan Palloseura players
Veikkausliiga players
Finnish people of Polish descent
Expatriate footballers in Poland
Association football midfielders